Poale Zion (also spelled Poalei Tziyon or Poaley Syjon, meaning "Workers of Zion") was a movement of Marxist–Zionist Jewish workers founded in various cities of Poland, Europe and the Russian Empire in about the turn of the 20th century after the Bund rejected Zionism in 1901.

Formation and early years

Ideology 
The key features of the ideology of early Poale Zion were acceptance of the Marxist view of history with the addition of the role of nationalism, which theorist Ber Borochov, a leader of Poale Zion, believed could not be ignored as a factor in historical development. A Jewish proletariat would come into being in the Land of Israel, according to Poale Zion, and would then take part in the class struggle. These views were set out in Borochov's Our Platform, published in 1906.

Early parties and organisations 

Poale Zion parties and organisations were started across the Jewish diaspora in the early 20th century. A branch of Poale Zion came into existence in New York City in 1903. Branches were formed in London and Leeds in 1903/04 and 1905 respectively and on a national basis in 1906. An Austrian group was formed in 1904, and published a newspaper, Yidisher Arbeyter. In November 1905 the Poale Zion (Workers of Zion) Party was founded in Palestine and a month later the Socialist Jewish Labour Party (Poale Zion) was formed in the United States and Canada. In March 1906 the Jewish Social Democratic Labour Party (Poale Zion) was created in Russia. In 1906 a formal Poale Zion party was formed in Poltava, Ukraine, under the leadership of Ber Borochov and Itzhak Ben-Zvi, and other groups were soon formed elsewhere in Europe. A French group was formed, under the leadership of Marc Jarblum, which was influential on the SFIO and its leader Leon Blum. By 1907, the party had 25,000 members in Russia.

With the threat of pogroms and meeting clandestinely the Warsaw Poale Zion formed a commando unit (bojówka) with around sixty guns. They were used to "expropriate" funds from well to do citizens. In March 1906 the entire Warsaw leadership were amongst the 120 delegates arrested attending the Poale Zion conference in Poltava. Three months later eighteen gunmen raided Warsaw railway station, stealing cash and leaving "a receipt in the name of Warsaw's Poale Zion".

Global coordination 
A World Union of Poale Zion was formed. The first World Congress took place in August 1907 in The Hague. Its second congress in 1909 in Kraków emphasised practical socialist projects in Palestine, further congresses followed in Vienna (1911 and 1920) and Stockholm (1919).

Palestine 
A conference in the name of the Jewish Social-Democratic Workers' Party in the Land of Israel was held in Jaffa between 4–6 October 1906. It was organised by Israel Shochat who over the previous two years had organised an underground group of around 25 Poale Zion followers. About 60 people attended the conference and it was chaired by newly arrived David Ben Gurion.

As a result the following January they produced The Ramleh Program, a Hebrew version of the Communist Manifesto with the added declaration: 'the party aspires to political independence of the Jewish People in this country." After much debate they agreed that there should be segregation of Jewish and Arab economies. It was also agreed that all Poale Zion business should be conducted in Hebrew, though this was not the larger group's policy which held that proceedings should be in Yiddish or Ladino depending on the community. Hebrew was seen as the language of the bourgeoisie At the time there were 550 active pioneers, Jews working on the land, in the country.

In Ottoman Palestine, Poale Zion founded the Hashomer guard organization that guarded settlements of the Yishuv, and took up the ideology of "conquest of labor" (Kibbush Ha'avoda) and "Hebrew labor" (Avoda Ivrit). The first formal congress of the "Jewish Social Democratic Workers' Party in the Land of Israel–Poalei Tziyon" was held in early 1907. Poale Zion set up employment offices, kitchens and health services for members. These eventually evolved into the institutions of Labor Zionism in Israel.

UK during World War I 
During World War I, Poale Zion was instrumental in recruiting members to the Jewish Legion. Poale Zion was active in Britain during the war, under the leadership of J. Pomeranz and Morris Meyer, and influential on the British labour movement, including on the drafting (by Sidney Webb and Arthur Henderson) of the Labour Party's War Aims Memorandum, recognising the 'right of return' of Jews to Palestine, a document which preceded the Balfour Declaration by three months.

Factions and activity after World War I

Factions, 1920 split and aftermath 
Poale Zion was torn between Left and Right factions in 1919–1920, which formally split at the Poale Zion fifth world congress in Vienna in 1920, following a similar division that occurred in the Second International.

The right wing was less Marxist and more nationalist, and favoured a more moderate socialist program and supported the International Working Union of Socialist Parties to continue the work of the Second International, essentially becoming a social democratic party. The left wing faction did not consider the Second International radical enough and some accused its members of betraying Borochov's revolutionary principles (although Borochov had begun to modify his ideology as early as 1914, and publicly identified as a social democrat the year before his death).

Poale Zion Left, which supported the Bolshevik revolution, continued to be sympathetic to Marxism and Communism, and attended the second and third congresses of the Communist International in a consultative capacity. They lobbied for membership, but their attempts were unsuccessful, as the internationalist communist movement under Lenin and Trotsky was opposed to Zionist nationalism. The Comintern advised individual members of Left Poale Zion to join their national Communist parties as individuals; at their 1922 Danzig conference, these terms were rejected by the party. The Comintern declared it an enemy of the workers' movement.

Poale Zion Left opposed the decision by Poale Zion to rejoin the World Zionist Organization, viewing it as essentially bourgeois in character, and viewed the Histadrut as reformist and non-socialist. Aside from differing attitudes towards Zionism and Stalinism, the two wings of Poale Zion parted ways over Yiddish and Yiddish culture. The Left was more supportive of the latter, similar to the members of the Jewish Bund, while the Right bloc identified strongly with the emerging modern Hebrew movement in the early 20th century.

Palestine 
In Palestine, the major leaders of Poale Zion since their immigration in 1906 and 1907 had been David Ben-Gurion, who joined a local Poalei Tziyon group in 1904 whilst living in Warsaw, and Yitzhak Ben-Zvi, a close friend of Borochov's and early member of the Poltava group. After the split the two Benim ("the Bens") continued to control and direct Poale Zion Right in Palestine.

The party in Palestine split into right and left wings at its February 1919 conference. In October 1919, a faction of the Left Poale Zion founded Mifleget Poalim Sozialistiim (Socialist Workers Party) which became the Jewish Communist Party in 1921, split in 1922 over the Zionist issues, with one faction taking the name Palestine Communist Party and the more anti-Zionist faction becoming the Communist Party of Palestine. The former retained its links to Poale Zion Left. These two factions reunited as the Palestine Communist Party in 1923 and become an official section of the Communist International. Another faction of Poale Zion Left, aligned with the kibbutz movement Hashomer Hatzair, founded in Europe in 1919, became the Mapam party. Poale Zion Right, under Ben Gurion's leadership, formed Ahdut HaAvoda in March 1919. In January 1930 it merged with another party to become Mapai, predecessor of the modern Israeli Labor Party.

Bolshevik Revolution and USSR 
In Russia, the Poale Zion Left participated in the Bolshevik Revolution and organized a brigade of Poale Zion activists nicknamed the "Borochov Brigade" to fight in the Red Army. The party remained legal until 1928 when it was liquidated by the NKVD. Most other Zionist organizations had been closed down in 1919, but Poale Zion Left remained untouched because it was recognized as a Communist party. In 1919, the Communists of Poale Zion Left split to form the Jewish Communist Party which ultimately joined the Communist Party of the Soviet Union, leading to a sharp loss of membership in Russia. While the Bund was forcibly disbanded in 1921, Poale Zion and Hechalutz were allowed to operate freely in the Soviet Union until 1928.

Poland 
In Poland, for a brief period following the war, both factions of Poale Zion were reported as legal and functioning political parties. The Polish Left party was the largest Left Poale Zion party in the world. It worked closely with the Bund in developing Yiddish schools in Poland and supporting secular Yiddish culture, although they had political differences (e.g., the Bund was more supportive of the Polish Socialist Party than LPZ). As part of the large-scale ban on Jewish political parties in post-war Poland by the Communist leadership, both Poale Zion groups were disbanded in February 1950.

Austria 
In Austria, the left faction was led by Michael Kohn-Eber, who joined the Austrian Communist Party in 1938. The right faction also remained active until 1938.

United States 
The first Poale Zion group in America was established in 1903. In 1915 it was estimated they had fewer than 3,000 members. After the First World War, the American party was led by veteran socialist Zionist thinker Nachman Syrkin. In America, the right faction was dominant, and initiated the National Labor Committee for Palestine, raising money for the Histadrut.

United Kingdom 
Poale Zion in Britain formally affiliated to the British Labour Party in 1920.

Worldwide 
Globally, Poale Zion, under the leadership of Shlomo Kaplansky was involved in the 1921 formation of the centrist International Working Union of Socialist Parties, then between 1923 and 1930 the World Union of Poalei Zion (i.e., the PZ right) joined the Labour and Socialist International (as its Palestine section). As of 1928, it claimed to have 22,500 members in branches around the world; 5,000 in Poland and the United States, 4,000 in Palestine, 3,000 in Russia, 1,000 in Lithuania, Romania, Argentina and the United Kingdom, 500 in Latvia and another 1,000 scattered across countries such as Germany, Austria, Czechoslovakia, Belgium, France and Brazil. The general secretary of the World Union of Poalei Zion at the time was Berl Locker. The World Union had a women's wing, the Women's Organization for the Pioneer Women in Palestine.

World Union of Zionists-Socialists (1932) 
In 1932, Poale Zion's world federation merged with Hitahdut Olamit, the World Union of Hapoel Hatzair and Zeirei Zion, to create Ihud Olami, the World Union of Zionists-Socialists. In this period, several well-known Zionist leaders and politicians were active in Poale Zion, including Ben-Gurion, Ben-Zvi, kibbutz movement leader Yitzhak Tabenkin, Jewish Agency Executive member Shlomo Kaplansky, and future Israeli politicians Moshe Sharett and Dov Hoz.

The Holocaust 
The Holocaust-era Jewish resistance group ŻOB was formed from a coalition including Hashomer Hatzair, Dror, Bnei Akiva, the Jewish Bund, various Jewish Communist groups, and both factions of Poale Zion. Poale Zion was also active in the Anti-Fascist Bloc.

Several notable Jewish resistance fighters during the Holocaust, particularly those involved in the Warsaw Ghetto Uprising, were members of Poale Zion. They include:
 Adolf Berman, Warsaw ŻOB fighter; Secretary of Zegota (Poale Zion Left)
 Hersz Berlinski, member of Warsaw ŻOB Command (Poale Zion Left)
 Yochanan Morgenstern, member of Warsaw ŻOB Command (Poale Zion Right)
 Emanuel Ringelblum, member of Warsaw ŻOB; chronicler of the Warsaw Ghetto (Poale Zion Left)

Legacy

Mandatory Palestine and Israel 
After World War I, David Ben-Gurion integrated most of Poale Zion Right in Palestine into his Ahdut HaAvoda party, which became Mapai by the 1930s. The Poale Zion Left merged with the kibbutz-based Hashomer Hatzair Workers Party of Palestine and the urban-based Socialist League of Palestine to form Mapam in 1948, which in the 1990s merged with two smaller parties, Ratz and Shinui, to form Meretz. In 1946, a split in Mapai led to the creation of another small party, Ahdut HaAvoda – Poale Zion, which united with Mapam in 1948. In 1954, a small group of Mapam dissidents left the party, again assuming the Ahdut HaAvoda – Poale Zion name. That party eventually became part of the Alignment in a 1965 merger with Mapai (and later included Rafi and Mapam). In 1992, the Alignment became the Israeli Labour Party.

Youth movements 
Several youth movements have emerged out of Poale Zion: the Marxist Hashomer Hatzair (the largest, with 70,000 members on the eve of the Holocaust), the socialist Habonim Dror, the Left Poale Zion's Yugent, and Zeirei Zion.

North America  
In North America, Poale Zion founded the HeHalutz movement, the Farband and Habonim Dror, and later the Labor Zionist Organization of America, which merged with other groups into the Labor Zionist Alliance, which rebranded itself in 2007 as Ameinu. US Poale Zion published a Yiddish newspaper, the Yidisher Kempfer, and an English journal, Jewish Frontier, edited by Hayim Greenberg and Marie Syrkin.

United Kingdom 
In Britain, Poale Zion rebranded itself in 2004 as the Jewish Labour Movement. Its original affiliate status with the Labour Party in 1920 was as The Jewish Socialist Labour Party (Poale Zion).

Worldwide 
Internationally, the Poale Zion right is represented within the World Zionist Organization by the World Labour Zionist Movement; the group "to the left" of the WLZM within the WZO is Mapam's successor, the World Union of Meretz. Meretz succeeded Mapam as a member of the Socialist International and, since 2013, is also a member of the Progressive Alliance.

See also 
 Jewish Communist Labour Party (Poalei Zion)
 Jewish Communist Party (Poalei Zion)
 Jewish Communist Union (Poalei Zion)
 Poalei Agudat Yisrael
 Mifleget Poale Zion VeHaHugim HaMarksistim beEretz Yisrael
 Labour Zionism
 Gordonia
 Farband
 Jewish left

References

Bibliography 
Dominik Flisiak, Wybrane materiały ideologiczne i propagandowe Syjonistyczno-Socjalistycznej Partii Robotniczej Poalej Syjon-Hitachdut. Przyczynek do badań nad lewicą syjonistyczną w pierwszych latach powojennej Polski (1944/45-1949/50), Chrzan 2021.

External links 
 MideastWeb: A brief history of Labor and Socialist Zionism
 Poale Zion Archive at M.I.A.
 The Ber Borochov Internet Archive at Angelfire
 Der neue Weg, B311, a digitized periodical published by the organization, at the Leo Baeck Institute, New York 
 The Ber Borochov Internet Archive at M.I.A.
 Ber Borochov: The National Question and Class Struggle, 1905
 Poalei Tziyon: Our Platform, 1906 — founding program of Poale Zion, sets out its analysis, at JewishVirtualLibrary
 Ber Borochov: The Economic Development of the Jewish People, 1916
 Poalei Tziyon Peace Manifesto, 1917
 Ber Borochov: Eretz Yisrael in our program and tactics, 1917
 Levic Jessel: Biographical note on Borochov, 1935 - a description of Poale Zion split
 Abraham Ducker: Theories of Borochov Part II, 1937 — More detail on the split

 
Jewish political parties
Zionist political parties in Europe
Jewish socialism
Political parties of minorities in Imperial Russia
Political parties of the Russian Revolution
Political parties in Mandatory Palestine
Defunct political parties in Poland
Defunct socialist parties in Russia
Defunct socialist parties in Ukraine
Jewish Polish history
Jewish Russian and Soviet history
Jewish Ukrainian history
Members of the Labour and Socialist International
Second International
Zionism in Lithuania
Zionism in Russia
Zionist organizations
Political parties established in 1901
Political parties disestablished in 1950
Labor Zionism
Jewish groups in Lithuania